Leżajsk is a town in Podkarpackie Voivodeship, Poland.

Leżajsk may also refer to:

Leżajsk County, unit of territorial administration in Podkarpackie Voivodeship
Gmina Leżajsk, administrative districts in Poland
Leżajsk Brewery, brewery belonging to the Żywiec Group
Leżajsk Transmitter, 130 metre guyed steel mast belonging to the INFO-TV-OPERATOR company